Yen Hsing-su (born 8 September 1976), also known as Johnny Yen, is a Taiwanese basketball coach and former basketball player, singer and actor. Since 2017 he has been the assistant coach of the Chinese Taipei men's national basketball team. From 2015 to 2017 he coached the Fubon Braves in Taiwan's Super Basketball League.

Nicknamed "The Basketball Genie" (籃球精靈) for his playmaking skills, Yen was a regular of the Chinese Taipei national basketball team from 1997 to 2003. At the 2003 ABC Championship, he led the tournament in assists (4.7 per game), but retired soon afterwards to pursue a career in entertainment. In the years to follow, he led the boy band 183 Club and also starred in many popular TV dramas. He returned to professional basketball in 2007 and permanently retired in 2010. He has played professionally in both Taiwan (Chinese Basketball Alliance) and mainland China (Chinese Basketball Association).

Basketball career
Yen was a high school star back in Private NanShan Senior High School and turned professional in 1995 with the Tera Mars (later Kaohsiung and BCC Mars) in the Chinese Basketball Alliance of Taiwan.  As starting point guard, he led the league in assists for the 1997–1998 season and was then ranked among the best and brightest next-generation backcourt players in Taiwan.  He was also selected to the Chinese Taipei senior basketball team from 1997 until 2003.

Around the start of the 21st century, however, Yen Hsing-su started to suffer from a succession of knee injuries.  In his last appearance on the national team, Yen led the FIBA Asian Championship in assists, signifying his ability to continuously compete at Asia's highest level of basketball if free from injury.  Yet, he decided to become a full-time entertainer after completing the first season (2003–2004) of the newly founded Super Basketball League (SBL).  This was presumably due to the chronic knee problem and, arguably, the success of his new entertainment career following the airing of My MVP Valentine, a basketball-themed TV drama he starred in while healing the initial knee injury in 2002.

In 2007, Yen returned to basketball when he signed with Yunnan Bulls in the Chinese Basketball Association in mainland China to play in the 2007–2008 season.  As a starter, he averaged 8.1 points and 5.2 assists (3rd in the league) in 22 games.  After the season, he returned to Taiwan to play for Taiwan Beer in the SBL where he won his only club championship title.  In the ensuing 2009–2010 season, Yen once again joined the Chinese professional league to play for the Shanghai Sharks.

Currently, Yen is an assistant coach in Brigham Young University–Hawaii and a sports commentator at FOX Sports Taiwan.

Filmography (TV Dramas)

External links

Notes and references

1978 births
Living people
Taiwanese men's basketball players
Taiwanese male television actors
Fu Jen Catholic University alumni
183 Club members
Sportspeople from New Taipei
Taiwanese basketball coaches
Point guards
Shanghai Sharks players
Taiwanese expatriate basketball people in China
21st-century Taiwanese male singers
Musicians from New Taipei
Male actors from New Taipei
Taiwan Beer basketball players
Taoyuan Pilots head coaches
Chinese Taipei men's national basketball team players
Chinese Taipei men's national basketball team coaches
Super Basketball League players
Mars basketball players
Chinese Basketball Alliance players
BCC Mars players